Vladyslav Kyryn (born 10 February 1977) is a Ukrainian professional footballer who plays as a forward.

Career
In 2018, he started playing for Avangard Korukivka, where he played 26 caps and he scored 3 goals. In 2020, he moved to FC Kudrivka, where he played 8 games and scored 3 goals.

FC Chernihiv 
In 2021 he moved to FC Chernihiv in the Ukrainian Second League. On 10 April 2021 he made his debut against Karpaty Halych in the season 2020-21 in Chernihiv at the Chernihiv Arena. He played 7 games in Ukrainian Second League, helping the club to avoid relegation.

References

External links
 on Official website of FC Chernihiv
 Profile on Official website of Ukrainian Second League
 Vladyslav Kyryn soccerway.com

1997 births
Living people
Footballers from Chernihiv
Association football defenders
FC Chernihiv players
FC Avanhard Koriukivka players
FC Kudrivka players
Ukrainian footballers
Ukrainian Second League players